Kenneth Stevens or Ken Stevens may refer to:

 Kenneth H. Stevens (1922–2005), British Scouting leader
 Kenneth N. Stevens (1924–2013), Canadian electrical engineer and acoustic phonetics scientist
 Ken Stevens (businessman) (born ), New Zealand engineer and businessman